Grabštejn is a castle situated not far from the city of Liberec, in the Liberec Region of the Czech Republic, near the three-country-border area where the borders of the Czech Republic, Germany, and Poland meet.

History

The original Gothic castle of Grafenstein was founded in the 13th century. In 1562, it was bought by Crown Chancellor Georg Mehl von Strelitz. Between 1566 and 1586, he had rebuilt the castle in Renaissance style and thus turned it into a representative chateau.

Georg Mehl also had a steward's house built below the castle, which was around the year 1830 rebuilt in Classicist style. Shortly before that – around 1818 – Christian of Clam-Gallas had built the New Castle near the Old Castle. The new building was surrounded by a large garden with a number of valuable plants. The Old Castle has preserved its original Renaissance appearance despite a fire which damaged its upper floors in 1843.

The House of Clam-Gallas owned Grabštejn since 1704 until it was confiscated in 1945. After the Second World War, the castle was open to the public, but in 1953, the whole castle complex was taken over by the Ministry of Defence. The Old Castle's condition significantly deteriorated after the army left in the late 1980s.

Repairs and restorations began in 1989. Nowadays, Grabštejn is one of the best restored monuments of great importance in the Czech Republic. The castle was opened to the public again in 1993. The tower offers a marvellous view of the three-border-triangle, the castle's northern wing, and the vault. The most touristically attractive part of the castle interior is the St. Barbara chapel decorated with Renaissance fresco paintings from the 16th century. All parts of the ceiling and walls are ornamented in with interlaced figural, animal, and heraldic motifs.

See also
 List of castles in the Liberec Region

Images

External links 

 Hrad Grabštejn

Liberec
Villages in Liberec District
Castles in the Liberec Region
Museums in the Liberec Region
Historic house museums in the Czech Republic
National Cultural Monuments of the Czech Republic